Saint Bernard is a ski, snowboard and apparel retail shop and online store based in Dallas, Texas. It has two retail locations in the Dallas, Texas, area with other locations in Houston and Austin.

Company history

St. Bernard Sports was founded in 1978 by Wes Goyer. The company began by specializing in high end retail fashion and surf, snowboard and ski products but expanded its business model to include other types of apparel and in 1998 began carrying shoes and sportswear. Two of its retail locations features ski shop services. St. Bernard Sports currently advertises locally in the Dallas–Fort Worth area.

Online growth

Prior to 2009, St. Bernard Sports maintained a website but did not sell products online. In the Fall of 2009, Stbernardsports.com (now saintbernard.com) began selling products available from its five stores on its website.

Products

The company currently focuses on carrying men's, women's and children's skis and snowboarding equipment as well as high end and preppy clothing, including fashion accessories such as sunglasses, watches and bags. The company also features ski shop services including tuning and ski waxing at two of its locations. There are currently large numbers of brands of products sold in the St. Bernard store such as Vineyard Vines, True Grit Pullovers, Southern Tide, Peter Millar, Lilly Pulitzer, Hunter Rain Boots, Ugg boots, and high end and imported winter brands like Bogner and Patagonia. St. Bernard Sports also features a selection of men's, women's and kid's swimwear, including brands such as Vix, Trina Turk, L*Space, Peter Millar, Vineyard Vines, Tommy Bahama and Seafolly.

References

Further reading

External links 
 

Retail companies of the United States
Companies based in Dallas